Eduardo Sebrango Rodríguez (born 13 April 1973) is a retired Cuban footballer.

Career

Club
Sebrango started his career in Cuba with his hometown team, Sancti Spíritus where he played with the club for 14 seasons as both a youth and a senior player.

Vancouver 86ers
Sebrango immigrated from Cuba to Canada in 1998, and was subsequently signed by the Vancouver 86ers of the then A-League. He scored 18 goals and recorded 10 assists for Vancouver before being signed by Hershey Wildcats in 2001.

Montreal Impact
In 2002 Sebrango was signed by Montreal Impact, and in his first season he scored 18 goals in 28 games and was named to the USL First Division All-Star Team. In 2004 Sebrango helped the Impact lift the USL First Division championship trophy as the Impact defeated the Seattle Sounders 2–0 on 18 September. During the regular season, Sebrango contributed eight goals and three assists. In total Sebrango appeared in 83 games, notching 36 goals and six assists making him the second All-Time scorer for the club.

Return to Vancouver
In 2006 Sebrango was traded to the Vancouver Whitecaps FC in exchange for Daniel Antoniuk. With the 'Caps he played an important playoff role where he scored a goal in 2–0 victory over the Miami FC. In the semi-final game he scored a memorable goal against his former team Montreal Impact which the Caps won 2–0. Unfortunately, Sebrango was ejected from the game after scoring his goal for excessive celebration for removing his shirt, and was suspended for the final. With Sebrango in the stands his team were able to win the USL First Division Championship beating the Rochester Raging Rhinos 3–0, his third title with three different teams.

In 2008 Sebrango led the Whitecaps in regular season scoring with 12 goals and three assists for 27 points in 29 matches. Sebrango also had two goals in three Nutrilite Canadian Championship games and two goals in five playoff matches. He played a significant role to help the Whitecaps win their second USL First Division championship in three years.

On 30 September 2008 was called up for the USL First Division All-League Team.

Return to Montreal
In November 2008, Sebrango was signed once again by Montreal Impact. In his first appearance back with the Impact, Sebrango scored Montreal's two goals in the first game of the CONCACAF Champions League quarterfinal against Santos Laguna.

During the 2009 USL season Sebrango contributed by helping the Impact clinch a playoff spot under new head coach Marc Dos Santos. On 22 July Sebrango scored both his 99th and 100th career goals in the USL First Division in a thrilling 4–1 victory over the Cleveland City Stars. In the playoffs, he recorded his first goal in the second match against the Puerto Rico Islanders of the semifinals. He scored the winning goal for the Impact in a 2–1 victory which allowed the Impact to advance to the finals. In the playoffs their opponents would end up being the Vancouver Whitecaps FC this marking the first time in USL history where the final match would consist of two Canadian clubs. On 10 October 2009 in the first match of the finals Sebrango scored once again the winning goal in 3–2 victory at Vancouver. Montreal would later on win the second match to a score of 3–1, thus making Montreal win the series 6–3 on aggregate. The victory gave the Impact their third USL Championship and also the victory marked Sebrango's league record fifth USL Championship (including the USL's predecessor, the A-League).

Sebrango retired before the 2011 season but then re-joined Montreal in mid-season 2011. The following year Sebrango moved with Montreal Impact to Major League Soccer as the club became the 19th team in MLS.

FC L'Assomption
Sebrango announced his (second) retirement on 1 November 2012 following Montreal Impact's inaugural season in MLS. He has signed with semi-pro Division 3 side FC L'Assomption of the Première Ligue de soccer du Québec for the 2013 season.

International
Sebrango was a regular with the Cuban national team between 1996 and 1998, and played 23 games, scoring 13 goals prior to immigrating to Canada. He represented his country in 10 FIFA World Cup qualification matches (4 goals).

His final international was a February 1998 CONCACAF Gold Cup match against Costa Rica.

Personal
Following his departure from Cuba, Sebrango became a Canadian citizen. However, he was ineligible to play for the Canadian national team due to his prior appearances for Cuba. Sebrango completed a degree in physical education at Filial Universitaria in Sancti Spiritus, Cuba. While it has frequently been misreported by the media, Eduardo did not defect from Cuba but rather immigrated to Canada as a permanent resident. He remains proud of his country and heritage and returns to Cuba often to be with his family.

In addition to his playing career, Sebrango is a coach for the North Shore Player Premier Program Club, coaching the U-14 Metro Selects Club.

His son, Donovan, is an ice hockey player and was selected by the Detroit Red Wings 63rd overall, in the 2020 NHL Entry Draft.

Honours

Rochester Rhinos
USL First Division Championship (1): 2000

Montreal Impact
USL First Division Championship (2): 2004, 2009
USL First Division Commissioner's Cup (1): 2005
Voyageurs Cup (4): 2002, 2003, 2004, 2005

Vancouver Whitecaps
USL First Division Championship (2): 2006, 2008

Individual
Canadian Championship Golden Boot: 2008 (co-winner)

Career stats

 Lamar Hunt U.S. Open Cup (American Based Clubs) - Nutrilite Canadian Cup (Canadian Based Clubs)
 CONCACAF Champions League

References

External links
North Shore Player Premier Program

1973 births
Living people
Association football forwards
Canadian people of Cuban descent
Cuban footballers
Cuba international footballers
1998 CONCACAF Gold Cup players
Cuban emigrants to Canada
Cuban expatriate footballers
Cuban expatriate sportspeople in Canada
Cuban expatriate sportspeople in the United States
Expatriate soccer players in Canada
Expatriate soccer players in the United States
FC Sancti Spíritus players
Hershey Wildcats players
Major League Soccer players
Montreal Impact (1992–2011) players
CF Montréal players
Naturalized citizens of Canada
North American Soccer League players
People from Sancti Spíritus
Première ligue de soccer du Québec players
Rochester New York FC players
USL First Division players
USSF Division 2 Professional League players
A-League (1995–2004) players
Vancouver Whitecaps (1986–2010) players
FC L'Assomption players